Leonard Frederick Oliver (1 August 1905 – 1967) was an English international footballer, who played as a right half.

Career
Born in Fulham, Oliver played professionally for Fulham, and earned one cap for England in 1929.

References

1905 births
1967 deaths
English footballers
England international footballers
Fulham F.C. players
English Football League players
Footballers from Fulham
Association football midfielders